The genus name Dipladenia or the common name dipladenia can refer to several flowering plants:

 Galactophora crassifolia, formerly Dipladenia calycina
 Mandevilla, several species
 Pentalinon luteum, yellow dipladenia, formerly Dipladenia flava
 Odontadenia macrantha, formerly Dipladenia brearleyana
 Rhabdadenia biflora, formerly Dipladenia billbergii

Apocynaceae genera
Historically recognized angiosperm genera